

Station List

G